Jonestown is a neighborhood in the southeastern district of Baltimore. Its boundaries are the north side of Pratt Street, the west side of Central Avenue, the east side of Fallsway, and the south side of Orleans Street. The neighborhood lies north of the Little Italy, south of the Old Town, west of the Washington Hill, and east of the Downtown Baltimore neighborhoods. The southern terminus of the Jones Falls Expressway is located here.

Jonestown is a historical section of southeast Baltimore established in 1732 that was laid out on  divided into twenty lots on the east side of the Jones Falls. The district is a mix of industrial, commercial and residential buildings. In the last half of the 20th century, Jonestown has shifted from a predominantly Eastern European and Jewish neighborhood into a predominantly African-American neighborhood. Public housing replaced many of the former rowhomes and townhouses throughout the area, though a historical presence is still felt. In the early 2000s, though, modern row housing replaced the public housing. Jonestown is home to Baltimore's central post office in addition to 8 Baltimore City Landmarks including the Flag House; the Jewish Museum of Maryland, home of the Lloyd Street Synagogue; the Reginald F. Lewis Museum of Maryland African American History and Culture; the Carroll Mansion; the Phoenix Shot Tower; the Old Town Friends' Meeting House; The House at 9 North Front Street; and the McKim's School.

Government and infrastructure
The United States Postal Service operates the Baltimore Main Post Office at 900 East Fayette Street in Jonestown.

References

External links
Demographics from Baltimore Neighborhood Indicators Alliance
Neighborhood Information from Baltimore City Website
Jonestown Historic District

 
Neighborhoods in Baltimore
Historic districts in Baltimore
Historic Jewish communities in the United States
Baltimore National Heritage Area
1732 establishments in Maryland